Badhaai Do is a 2022 Indian Hindi comedy drama film depicting a couple in a lavender marriage. It stars Rajkummar Rao and Bhumi Pednekar and is written by Suman Adhikary and Akshat Ghildial and directed by Harshavardhan Kulkarni. The film is produced by Junglee Pictures, and serves as a spiritual sequel of the 2018 film Badhaai Ho. The principal photography began on 5 January 2021 in Dehradun. Badhaai Do was theatrically released on 11 February 2022.

Plot 
Shardul Thakur is a police officer whose widowed mother keeps bugging him to get married. Then we are introduced to Suman Singh, also known as Sumi, who is a physical education teacher and meets a woman on a lesbian dating app. This woman asks Sumi to meet her in a café, to which she agrees. On reaching the café, Sumi realizes that she had been chatting with a man masquerading all along as a lesbian. Afraid, Sumi leaves the café, but the man begins to stalk her. When she threatens to report him to the police, his counterthreat is to expose her as a lesbian. Fed up with his blackmail, Sumi reports it to Shardul, who happens to work in a police station largely peopled by female officers. Shardul meets Sumi and tells her that the man from the dating app has been warned. He makes a deal of marriage with Sumi while revealing that he is gay himself, and that getting married would placate both their families. Sumi accepts the deal and they get married.

On their honeymoon, Shardul introduces his boyfriend Kabir to Sumi. After returning from the trip, Shardul and Sumi move into police quarters. Later, Sumi gets to know Rimjhim, who works in a hospital. They go out on a date, where Rimjhim opens up about being rejected by her family for being a lesbian. They start a relationship immediately after, and Rimjhim moves into Sumi's room. Rimjhim finds Sumi's passport, which had never been stamped, and Sumi confesses her desire to have a child, and says she got the passport hoping she could move abroad to adopt. When Shardul's superior's wife questions them about Rimjhim, they brush it off saying that she is their cousin.

When Shardul becomes suspicious that Kabir is cheating on him, he hits him. This causes Kabir to walk out on him, leaving Shardul devastated. Some time later, Shardul is controlling a group of homophobic protestors outside a gay wedding, where Guru Narayan, a queer lawyer, sees him. He immediately takes a liking to Shardul, and slips his business card into Shardul's pocket. They begin dating shortly after, and Guru Narayan is introduced to Sumi and Rimjhim. 

Later, Shardul and Sumi go to Shardul's home for Diwali. When questioned about her not being pregnant yet, Shardul tells his brother-in-law that Sumi is infertile, and asks him not to share it with the rest of the family. He breaks his promise and does so anyway, and Shardul's family tricks Sumi into taking a fertility test, which comes out normal. Shardul's mother moves into their quarters to make sure that they have a physical relationship. While talking about this, Sumi tells her mother-in-law that Shardul is infertile, backing this up with a falsified test from Rimjhim's lab. Shardul's and Sumi's families agree that the couple should adopt a child, which leaves Sumi overjoyed. They go to an adoption agency and put in an application.

Shardul's mother leaves for her home, but returns as she misses the train, only to see Sumi and Rimjhim being intimate. She tells this to both the families. Shardul asks Sumi not to reveal his sexual orientation. Sumi's mother and brother admonish her, and her father silently leaves the house. Sumi follows her father and tells him she thought he was the one family member who would stand by her no matter what. Shardul's family is furious with Sumi for being a lesbian. Shardul then confesses to his family that he is gay in a show of solidarity. His mother accepts his identity, which Shardul shares with Sumi with great joy. Later, Shardul puts on a rainbow-colored mask at a Pride parade, coming out to his coworkers.

Sumi and Shardul decide to get divorced, but Shardul receives a message stating that their adoption application has been accepted. This makes them reconsider divorce, and they decide to remain married so that they can adopt. One year later, Shardul and Sumi adopt a baby and perform an adoption ritual, in which Rimjhim participates as one of the parents. Shardul's superior and his wife visit their home for the ritual. Seeing them, Rimjhim leaves Sumi's side. Sumi's father tells Rimjhim to continue the ritual, telling her that the ritual needs the mother's presence. Shardul invites Guru Narayan to accompany him in the ritual. The superior remains confused seeing this, but the four smile as vibrantly as a rainbow.

Cast 
 Rajkummar Rao as Shardul Thakur, a policeman
 Bhumi Pednekar as Suman 'Sumi' Singh, a physical education teacher
 Chum Darang as Rimjhim Jongkey, Suman's girlfriend
 Sheeba Chaddha as Mrs. Thakur, Shardul's mother
 Seema Pahwa as Shardul's tayi ji
 Gulshan Devaiah as Guru Narayan, Shardul's boyfriend
 Loveleen Mishra as Mrs. Singh, Suman's mother
 Nitesh Pandey as Prem Singh, Suman's father
 Vyom Yadav as Naman Singh, Suman's brother
 Abhay Joshi as Dehradun DSP
 Durga Sharma as DSP's wife
 Shireesh Dobriyal as Shardul's taya ji
 Priyanka Charan as Rekha, Shardul's cousin
 Shashi Bhushan as Dr. Anoop Parihar, Rekha's husband
 Nutan Sinha as Nishita, Shardul's cousin
 Archana Patel as Vineeta, Shardul's cousin
 Sarita Rana as Mahila Thana SHO
 Nindhi Bhati as Naaznin Baig, the police constable
 Krishan Kumar as Sirohi, the police constable
 Gurleen Kaur as Urvashi
 Ananya Gaur as Pihu
 Chetan Dhawan as Rajeev Paddisetti aka Raju
 Karuna Prakash as Suman's Priya Mausi
 Babita Anand as Kusum, Priya Mausi's Friend
 Mitisha Arora as Sarita, Shardul's cousin
 Arti Shahi as Udita, Shardul's cousin
 Prabhu Bhatt as Priyanshu
 Deepak Arora as Kabir, Shardul's ex-boyfriend
 Apeksha Porwal as Komal, Suman's ex-girlfriend
 Ritesh Singh as Aariv Dimri, Young Constable

Production 
The first schedule was wrapped on 25 February. The film was wrapped up on 6 March 2021.

Soundtrack 

The music of film was composed by Amit Trivedi, Tanishk Bagchi, Ankit Tiwari and Khamosh Shah while lyrics written by Varun Grover, Vayu, Anurag Bhumia, Azeem Shirazi and Anvita Dutt.

Reception

Box office 
Badhaai Do earned 1.65 crore at the domestic box office on its opening day. On the second day, the film collected 2.72 crore. On the third day, the film collected 3.45 crore, taking total weekend domestic collection to 7.82 crore.

, the film grossed  crore in India and  crore overseas, for a worldwide gross collection of  crore.

Critical response
Rachana Dubey of The Times of India gave the film 4/5 and wrote "Badhaai Do attempts to normalise the big-screen depiction of the gay and lesbian community and their romantic relationships. The film sensitively portrays the immense loneliness and sense of isolation that a gay person feels, especially when they lack a window to communicate openly with their family, and are forced to deal with issues on their own" Prathyush Parasuraman of Firstpost gave the film a rating of 4/5 and wrote "Badhaai Do is largely, and rightfully preoccupied with the sexuality of the characters, characters who are not paragons but people, they burp and fart and have loose anger and dark circles". Devesh Sharma of Filmfare gave the film a rating of 4/5 and wrote "The film makes a point that all kinds of love exists in the world and we shouldn't just pick one colour out of the rainbow but embrace the whole spectrum".
 
Saibal Chatterjee of NDTV gave 3.5 out of 5 and wrote "The film unequivocally champions the cause of individuality and inclusivity while delivering an engaging story that is funny, thought-provoking and intriguingly angular in one fell swoop". Zoom gave the film a rating of 3.5/5 and wrote "Rajkummar Rao, Bhumi Pednekar and team shoulder this bold film to show that 'love is love'" Stutee Ghosh of The Quint gave the film a rating of 3/5 and wrote "Badhaai Do Has Solid Performances, But Seems Overeager to Impress". Mohar Basu of Mid-Day gave the film a rating of 3/5 and wrote "Badhaai Do is an honest effort in the right direction, and one of the reasons it works is because it makes you wonder why the law doesn't allow members of LGBTQiA+ community to marry and have children". Shantanu Ray Chaudhuri of The Free Press Journal gave the film a rating of 3/5 and wrote "the film is eminently watchable, thanks in no mean manner to the two lead actors and the occasional throwaway line like being a lesbian 'hamare life ka hissa hai, puri life thodi na hai". 

Pinkvilla gave the film a rating of 3/5 and wrote "Badhaai Do strives to start a conversation but shines light on the actuality that we have a long way to go by holding a mirror to the society". Sukanya Verma of Rediff gave the film a rating of 3/5 and wrote "Rajkummar Rao is solid in what we've come to recognise as strictly Ayushmann Khurrana territory". Ankita Bhandari of Zee News gave the film 2.5 out of 5 stars and wrote "'Badhaai Ho' appears to be just another take on LGBTQ+ issues, this time adding the adoption angle to the otherwise commonplace matter of coming out of the closet and making your families understand". Shubhra Gupta of Indian Express gave the film 2.5 out of 5 stars and wrote 'Badhaai Do' falls into the same trap films with 'brave subjects' gravitate towards Monika Rawal Kukreja of The Hindustan Times wrote "Rajkummar Rao is in full form and on point as a gay cop. Bhumi Pednekar, too, delivers an excellent performance.

References

External links 
 
 

Indian LGBT-related films
Lesbian-related films
LGBT-related coming-of-age films
Films shot in Uttarakhand
Indian comedy-drama films
2020s Hindi-language films
2022 comedy-drama films
2022 LGBT-related films